Mokhtarabad (also Romanized as Mokhtārābād) is a village in Takab Rural District, Shahdad District, Kerman County, Kerman Province, Iran. At the 2006 census, its population was 78, in 19 families.

References 

Populated places in Kerman County